Saint Martin of Leon (c. 1130 – January 12, 1203) was a priest and canon regular of the Augustinian Order. Born at León, Martin, along with his father Juan, withdrew from the world to the canonry of St. Marcellinus in León after the death of his mother. Martin was educated at this canonry, and after the death of his father, Martin decided to undertake a major pilgrimage, visiting the cities of Rome and Constantinople.

Returning to Spain, he took the religious habit at St. Marcellinus, but after seeing this monastery had been secularized by the bishops he entered the collegiate of church St. Isidore in the same city. This is a church he went on to endow and is where Saint Isidore was buried, hence its name.

Martin distinguished himself by his zealous observance, his charity, and his deep devotion to the Blessed Sacrament. The date of his death is given to us by the necrology preserved in the monastery. He died on January 12, 1203, of natural causes. The religious of St. Isidore's dedicated a chapel to Martin very early and celebrated his feast each year.

Works 
Martin wrote commentaries on different Epistles and the Apocalypse, and he left numerous discourses on the many varied subjects. His complete works were published first by Espinosa (Seville, 1782), Migne in Patrologia Latina, LXXXI, 53-64, CCVIII, CCIX (Paris, 1855).

External links 

 Augustinian Canons: Blessed Martin of Leon
 Martin of Leon at the Catholic Encyclopedia

1130s births
1203 deaths
People from León, Spain
Augustinian canons
Medieval Spanish saints
13th-century Christian saints